Brian Harold Mason (18 April 1917 – 3 December 2009) was a New Zealand geochemist and mineralogist who was one of the pioneers in the study of meteorites. He played a leading part in understanding the nature of the Solar System through his studies of meteorites and lunar rocks. He also examined and classified thousands of meteorites collected from Antarctica.

Life 
Mason was born in Port Chalmers, Dunedin, in 1917 and was brought up in Christchurch, New Zealand. He was educated at Christchurch Boys' High School and studied geology and chemistry at Canterbury University College, graduating MSc with first-class honours in 1939. In November he left for Norway to work towards a doctorate, arriving in January 1940, but along with a colleague who held a British passport fled to Sweden in May following Operation Weserübung, the German invasion of Norway. In 1943, he completed a PhD in geochemistry at the University of Stockholm under Victor Goldschmidt and left the country for Britain.

He returned to Christchurch where he was appointed lecture of geology at Canterbury University College. He taught there for two years. In 1947, he was appointed professor of mineralogy at Indiana University where he was based for rest of his life. He was a curator of mineralogy at both the American Museum of Natural History, New York, and the Smithsonian Institution, Washington, D.C.

Mason died in Washington, D.C., on 3 December 2009 from renal failure. He was survived by his stepson, Frank W. Turner, who lived with Mason in Chevy Chase, MD.

His third wife, Margarita C. Babb, and mother of Frank Turner, died on 3 February 2009 due to complications from multiple myeloma. They were married for 15 years. Mason was married two other times, first to Anne Marie Linn and then to Virginia Powell; both marriages ended in divorce. He had a son, George, with his second wife.  George died in a mountain climbing accident in 1981 at the age of 20.

Awards and honours 
 Mason won the Leonard Medal from the Meteoritical Society in 1972 and the Roebling Medal from the Mineralogical Society of America in 1993.
 He was appointed an Honorary Fellow of the Royal Society of New Zealand in 1984.
 Two minerals, brianite and stenhuggarite, have been named after Mason. Brianite is a phosphate mineral (Na2CaMg(PO4)2) and stenhuggarite (meaning "mason") is a rare iron-antimony mineral.
 Asteroid 12926 Brianmason, discovered by Christine J. Schiff in 1999, is named in his honor. The official  was published by the Minor Planet Center on 13 October 2000.

Selected works 
 The literature of geology, American Museum of Natural History, 1953
 Meteorites, Wiley, 1962
 The lunar rocks, Authors Brian Harold Mason, William G. Melson, Wiley-Interscience, 1970, 
 Handbook of elemental abundances in meteorites, Editor Brian Harold Mason, Gordon and Breach, 1971
 Principles of Geochemistry Editor	Carleton B. Moore, Wiley, 1982, 
 Victor Moritz Goldschmidt: father of modern geochemistry, Geochemical Society, 1992,

See also 
 Glossary of meteoritics

References

External links 
 Photo of and interview with Mason as part of a longer piece about the Moon rocks, in Dutch, in Vrij Nederland, July 1994

 

1917 births
2009 deaths
New Zealand geochemists
People from Port Chalmers
People educated at Christchurch Boys' High School
Stockholm University alumni
University of Canterbury alumni
Academic staff of the University of Canterbury
Indiana University faculty
Smithsonian Institution people
People associated with the American Museum of Natural History
Meteorite researchers
Fellows of the Royal Society of New Zealand
New Zealand emigrants to the United States
Deaths from kidney failure
Presidents of the Geochemical Society